Bernard Pauncefote (28 June 1848 – 24 September 1882) was an English first-class cricketer active 1868–72 who played for Middlesex. He was born in Madras; died in Blackheath.

References

1848 births
1882 deaths
English cricketers
Middlesex cricketers
Marylebone Cricket Club cricketers
Oxford University cricketers
Gentlemen cricketers
People educated at Rugby School
Alumni of Brasenose College, Oxford
Gentlemen of the South cricketers